Veikko Kullervo Helle (11 December 1911, in Vihti – 5 February 2005, in Lohja) was a Finnish politician representing the Social Democrats. 

Helle was originally a carpenter by trade and followed his father into municipal politics and later into the parliament. He was elected in the 1936 municipal elections and he served as a member of parliament from 1951 to 1983. He was four times a minister between 1970 and 1983 and the speaker of the parliament from 1976 to 1978. Helle ran in the elections for SDP chairman in 1963, losing the post to Rafael Paasio. In the inner party politics, he represented the right-wing of the SDP. 

He served as the minister of labor on four occasions between 1970 and 1983.

Helle was a member of the Vihti municipal council for 51 years from 1936 to 1987, and was the chairman of the council 1958–1976.

References 

1911 births
2005 deaths
People from Vihti
People from Uusimaa Province (Grand Duchy of Finland)
Social Democratic Party of Finland politicians
Deputy Prime Ministers of Finland
Ministers of Labour of Finland
Speakers of the Parliament of Finland
Members of the Parliament of Finland (1951–54)
Members of the Parliament of Finland (1954–58)
Members of the Parliament of Finland (1958–62)
Members of the Parliament of Finland (1962–66)
Members of the Parliament of Finland (1966–70)
Members of the Parliament of Finland (1970–72)
Members of the Parliament of Finland (1972–75)
Members of the Parliament of Finland (1975–79)
Members of the Parliament of Finland (1979–83)